Alushta is a city of regional significance on the southern coast of the Crimean peninsula which is within the Republic of Crimea, an internationally recognized de jure part of Ukraine, but since 2014 a de facto federal subject of the Russian Federation. It is situated at the Black Sea beach line on the road from Hurzuf to Sudak, as well as on the Crimean Trolleybus line. Population: 

The area is notable for its arid, rocky terrain due to its proximity to Crimean mountains. During Byzantine times the town was called Alouston (Ἄλουστον) meaning "Unwashed". Vestiges survive of a Byzantine defensive tower from a fortress of which the city name has derived, as well as a 15th-century Genoese fortress. During the Genoese rule the name modified to Lusta. Adam Mickiewicz dedicated two of his Crimean Sonnets to Alushta.

It is also the home of Seyit the Wolf in the Turkish drama Kurt Seyit ve Sura.

In 1910, 544 Jews lived in Alushta, consisting about 13% of the town population. In 1939, they consisted only 2.3% of the town overall population, numbering 251 individuals. On 4 November 1941, the Germans occupied the town and on 24 November 1941, a unit of sonderkommando 10b shot to death 30 Jews along with captured communists and partisans. In early December 1941, about 250 Jews from Alushta were shot to death by sonderkommando 11b in the park of trade union sanatorium no. 7, which is today in the local center for children and creativity.

Climate

Alushta has a humid subtropical climate (Köppen climate classification: Cfa) that closely borders on a hot-summer Mediterranean climate (Köppen climate classification: Csa).

Gallery

International relations

Twin towns — Sister cities
Alushta is twinned with:
  Santa Cruz, United States
  Dzierżoniów, Poland
  Äänekoski, Central Finland
  Jūrmala, Latvia

References 

 
Alushta Municipality
Cities in Crimea
Seaside resorts in Ukraine
Seaside resorts in Russia
Territories of the Republic of Genoa
Port cities of the Black Sea
Port cities and towns in Ukraine
Port cities and towns in Russia
Cities of regional significance in Ukraine
Holocaust locations in Russia
Holocaust locations in Ukraine